Henry Middleton may refer to:
Sir Henry Middleton (captain) (died 1613), English sea captain and adventurer
Henry Middleton (1717–1784), American plantation owner and public official from South Carolina
Henry Middleton (governor) (1770–1846), American politician from South Carolina
Henry A. Middleton (1888–1975), American lawyer from Ohio

See also

Harry Middleton (disambiguation)